Furio Piccirilli  (March 27, 1868 – January 17, 1949) was an Italian-born American sculptor and one of the Piccirilli Brothers.

Piccirilli was born in Massa, Italy into a family with a long tradition of carving and sculpting.  Like his older brother Attilio he was educated at the Accademia di San Luca of Rome. With his brother Attilio he immigrated to England in the mid-1880s and then moved to the United States in 1888.  With their father and brothers he helped establish the Piccirilli Brothers carving business.

He was a well known and respected sculptor aside from being known in connection with his family firm. He was "considered the most creative and the best modeler" of all the brothers.

Piccirilli Brothers carved the architectural sculpture for the Parliament Building in Winnipeg, Manitoba. Furio modeled the four larger-than-life seated figures that flank the side entrances.

Furio returned to Italy to get married in 1921, and then moved there permanently in 1926.  He died in Rome in 1949.

Selected works
 Five white marble portrait busts over Front Lobby doors, Daughters of the American Revolution Headquarters, Washington, D.C. 
Bust of Ethan Allen (1911)
Bust of Isaac Shelby (1911)
Bust of John Adams (1911)
Bust of John Hancock (1911) 
Bust of John Stark (1911)
Eurydice (1911), marble. Exhibited at 1915 Panama-Pacific International Exposition (silver medal).
 Panama-Pacific International Exposition, San Francisco, 1915
 Fountain of Spring
 Fountain of Summer
 Fountain of Autumn
 Fountain of Winter
 Facade and West Gate (1915), California State Building, Balboa Park, San Diego, California
 Portia (niche figure) (1915), Martha Cook Building, University of Michigan, Ann Arbor
 Seated figures flanking side entrances, Parliament Building, Winnipeg, Manitoba
Lord Selkirk
Marquis of Dufferin
General Wolfe
Sieur de La Vérendrye (1920)
 Seal (1927), Metropolitan Museum of Art, Manhattan, New York City. Another carving is located at Brookgreen Gardens, Murrells Inlet, South Carolina.
 Penguin (1936), National Academy of Design, Manhattan, New York City

References

 Baker, Marilyn, Symbols in Stone: Manitoba’s Third Legislative Building: The Art and Politics of a Public Building, Hyperion Press Limited, Winnipeg, Manitoba, Canada, 1986-
  Koffler, Jerry and Eleanor, Freeing the Angel from the Stone: A Guide to Piccirilli Sculpture in New York City, The John D. Calandra Italian American Institute, New York,  2006
 Kvaran, Einar Einarsson, An Annotated Inventory of Outdoor Sculpture in Washtenaw County, Independent Study, Eastern Michigan University,  1989
 Lombardi, Josef Vincent, Piccirilli: Life of an American Sculptor, Pitman Publishing Corporation, New York.  1944
 Opitz, Glenn B., Mantle Fielding's Dictionary of American Painters, Sculptors & Engravers, Apollo Books, Poughkeepsie, NY,  1988

1869 births
1949 deaths
American people of Italian descent
Italian emigrants to the United States
19th-century American sculptors
19th-century Italian male artists
American male sculptors
20th-century American sculptors
20th-century American male artists
Italian sculptors
Italian male sculptors
People from Massa
Artists from the Bronx
19th-century American male artists